The men's sprint event at the 2020 Summer Olympics took place from 4 to 6 August 2021 at the Izu Velodrome. 30 cyclists from 18 nations competed.

Background

This will be the 27th appearance of the event, which has been held at every Summer Olympics except 1904 and 1912. Great Britain has won the last three sprint competitions.

Qualification

A National Olympic Committee (NOC) could enter up to 2 qualified cyclists in the men's sprint. Qualification is entirely through the 2018–20 UCI nation rankings. The eight nations that qualify for the team sprint event may enter two cyclists each in the individual sprint (as well as the Keirin). The nations that qualify a cyclist through the Keirin rankings may also enter that cyclist in the sprint. Finally, seven places are allocated through the individual sprint rankings; these places must ensure that each of the five continents are represented. Because qualification was complete by the end of the 2020 UCI Track Cycling World Championships on 1 March 2020 (the last event that contributed to the 2018–20 rankings), qualification was unaffected by the COVID-19 pandemic.

Competition format

For the first time since 2000, the sprint competition format is seeing significant changes. The number of main rounds is increasing from 5 to 6 and the number of repechages from 2 to 3. The competition begins, as usual, with a qualifying round of time trials (flying start 200 metres). The top 24 cyclists in the qualifying round (up from 18) qualify for match rounds. In each match round, the cyclists start side by side and must complete 3 laps of the track (750 metres). The last 200 metres are timed. The match rounds are as follows.
 Round 1 pairs the 24 cyclists into 12 heats; the winner of each advances to round 2 while the loser goes to the first repechage. 
 The first repechage places the 12 cyclists into 4 heats of 3 cyclists each; the winner of each heat rejoins the round 1 winners in advancing to round 2 while the remaining cyclists are eliminated.
 Round 2 pairs the 16 cyclists into 8 heats; the winner of each advances to the 1/8 finals while the loser goes to the second repechage.
 The second repechage again has 4 heats, this time of 2 cyclists each; the winner of each rejoins the round 2 winners and advances to the 1/8 finals while the loser of each heat is eliminated.
 The 1/8 finals pairs the 12 cyclists into 6 heats; the winner of each advances to the quarterfinals while the loser goes to the third repechage.
 The third repechage has 2 heats of 3 cyclists each; the winner goes to the quarterfinals while all others are eliminated (the classification 9–12 race has been removed).
 The quarterfinals begins best-two-of-three matches; the 8 cyclists are paired into 4 quarterfinals. The winner of two races in each quarterfinal goes to the semifinals, while the loser is placed in the classification 5–8 race.
 The semifinals again uses best-two-of-three matches, with the 4 cyclists paired into 2 semifinals. The winner of each semifinal goes to the final, the loser goes to the bronze medal match.
 The finals round includes the final, bronze medal match, and classification 5–8 race. The final and bronze medal match are one-on-one, best-two-of-three in format; the classification 5–8 race is a single race of 4 cyclists.

Schedule
All times are Japan Standard Time (UTC+9)

Results

Qualifying

1/32 finals

1/32 finals repechages

1/16 finals

1/16 finals repechages

1/8 finals

1/8 finals repechages

Quarterfinals

Classification 5–8

Semifinals

Finals

References

Men's sprint
Cycling at the Summer Olympics – Men's sprint
Men's events at the 2020 Summer Olympics